Richard Milbourne (died 1624) was an English bishop.

Life
He was born in London, and educated at Winchester School and Queens' College, Cambridge, where he matriculated in 1579, and graduated B.A. in 1582. He was Fellow of Queens' from 1582 to 1593. He became rector of Sevenoaks, Kent in 1607 (or 1611), of Cheam, Surrey, and vicar of Goudhurst, Kent. He was Dean of Rochester in 1611, and chaplain to Henry Frederick, Prince of Wales.

He became Bishop of St David's in 1615 and Bishop of Carlisle in 1621.

Notes

16th-century births
1624 deaths
Bishops of Carlisle
Bishops of St Davids
Deans of Rochester
Fellows of Queens' College, Cambridge
Alumni of Queens' College, Cambridge
English chaplains
Anglican chaplains
17th-century Welsh Anglican bishops
17th-century Church of England bishops